The Thomson Dam is a major Clay core and rockfill embankment dam with a Uncontrolled, Ogee-shaped overflow weir and chute spillway across the Thomson River, located about  east of Melbourne in the West Gippsland region of the Australian state of Victoria. The reservoir (or storage basin) created by the dam is officially called Thomson Reservoir, sometimes called Lake Thomson.

Location and features
The dam is located near the former township of Beardmore and the Baw Baw National Park.

Despite opposition from conservationists and farmers, plans for the dam were originally approved in late December 1975 to provide Melbourne with water security. A dam on the Thomson River was preferred because the river had a large flow, high water quality and was elevated high enough to provide water to the upper Yarra system by gravity flow.

Early work in the early 1970s saw construction of a  tunnel through the Thomson Yarra divide to allow water from the Thomson River to flow into the Upper Yarra Reservoir. Work on the dam itself commenced in 1976 and the completed dam and reservoir were ready to retain water by 1983.

The tunnel, which is located at the northern end of the reservoir, allows water to be transferred west to Upper Yarra Reservoir and then on to Silvan Reservoir for distribution as drinking water in Melbourne.

Hydroelectricity generation

Downstream releases from Thomson Reservoir pass through a 7.4 MW hydro power plant, at the base of the dam which generates electricity and feeds it into the state power grid.

Water supply levels
Between 1997 and 2011, drought depleted much of the reservoir's water. In early January 2006, the Thomson Dam was at 45.4%. While there were minor rises in water levels occasionally, the Thomson Dam reached its all-time low of 16.2% on 3 July 2009.

Heavy rainfall in 2010 and 2011 increased Melbourne's water storages to levels not seen for ten years. The Thomson Dam entered winter 2011 at 39% full and by the end of 2011 had reached 54.4% full.

On 28 October 2022, the dam reached 100% capacity and began spilling for the first time since the spring of 1996. 

The Thomson Dam is managed by Melbourne Water.

References

External links
 Lowdown on the Thomson Reservoir - The Age, 5 June 2003
 Crunch time today for Thomson Dam - The Age, 13 December 2006
 'Drought-proof' dam hits record low level

Dams in Victoria (Australia)
West Gippsland catchment
Rivers of Gippsland (region)
Dams completed in 1983
Embankment dams
Environment of Victoria (Australia)
1983 establishments in Australia